Mais Linhas Aéreas S/A was an airline based in Rio de Janeiro, Brazil, founded in 2010. It was authorized to operate domestic regular and non-regular flights.

History
Mais Linhas Aéreas was founded in 2010 and received its authorization to operate domestic flights on August 14, 2012.

Destinations
As of August 2012 Mais Linhas Aéreas operates charter passenger services contracted by tour operators.

Fleet
As of November 2012 the fleet of Mais Linhas Aéreas included the following aircraft:

Airline affinity program
Mais Linhas Aéreas has no Frequent Flyer Program.

See also
List of defunct airlines of Brazil

References

External links
Mais Photo Archive at airliners.net

Defunct airlines of Brazil
Airlines established in 2010
Airlines disestablished in 2013